William T. Elias (March 15, 1923 – June 28, 1998) was an American football coach.  He served as the head coach at George Washington University, the University of Virginia, and the United States Naval Academy. Elias compiled a career college football record of 36–48–5.

Biography
Elias attended Martins Ferry High School in Martins Ferry, Ohio, where he starred on the football and basketball teams. He went on to college at the University of Maryland. He was a guard on the football team in 1945 and 1946, but did not earn a varsity letter.

Elias began his coaching career at Richmond High School in Richmond, Indiana from 1950 to 1952. In his last two seasons there, he led two undefeated teams to consecutive North Central Conference championships and set the longest Indiana interscholastic winning streak at 22 games. In 1956, Elias was promoted from an assistant position to head backfield coach at Purdue. In 1960, he received his first collegiate head coaching position at George Washington, where he compiled a 5–3–1 record. From 1961 to 1964, he coached at Virginia, where he compiled a 16–23–1 record. From 1965 to 1968, he coached at Navy, where he compiled a 15–22–3 record.

In 1969 Elias was hired as an assistant coach for the Boston Patriots of the American Football League (AFL).

Head coaching record

College

References

1923 births
1998 deaths
American football guards
Boston Patriots coaches
Boston Patriots (AFL) coaches
George Washington Colonials football coaches
Maryland Terrapins football players
Navy Midshipmen football coaches
Purdue Boilermakers football coaches
Virginia Cavaliers football coaches
High school football coaches in Indiana
People from Martins Ferry, Ohio
Players of American football from Ohio